Ochsenwerder is a quarter in Hamburg, Germany, in the borough of Bergedorf. In 2020 the population was over 3,000. Agriculture plays a very big role in this quarter for the metropolitan area.

Geography
Ochsenwerder is in the southeast of Hamburg at the Elbe river.  In the south of Ochsenwerder is the Oortkaten lake. Ochsenwerder borders the quarters Kirchwerder, Reitbrook, Tatenberg and Spadenland. Furthermore Ochsenwerder borders to the quarter Wilhelmsburg and the Bundesland Lower Saxony with the Elbe river.

Politics
These are the results of Ochsenwerder in the Hamburg state election:

References

Quarters of Hamburg
Bergedorf